Samaira Rao is an Indian actress. She played the lead in the shows Love Marriage and Arranged Marriage, Savitri and she played the role of an agent in the serial Trideviyaan on SAB TV. The actress is also known for her bold appearance in the Salman Khan starrer film Prem Ratan Dhan Payo in which she played the role of Sameera. She had earlier made her debut in Bollywood with the movie Isi Life Main.

Samaira is born and brought up in Mumbai. She started her career in modeling with few TV advertisements. She did few small roles on TV, but her main role came in the serial Love Marriage Ya Arranged Marriage on Sony TV. She played the role of Mansi Sisodoya. This was a show based on family values and friendship. It was about two friends who are torn between the modern and traditional worlds with their eyes full of dreams of marriage. After being noticed as the main lead in this serial, Samaira was cast in other serials as main leads.

On SAB TV, the show Trideviyaan is getting good responses. It is loosely inspired by the movie Charlie’s Angels. Samaira played the role of Tanushree Chauhan also known as agent Hawa Mahal who fights villains with her techniques with her sidekicks and fast running techniques.

Television

Films

References

External links

Living people
Indian film actresses
Indian television actresses
1989 births